Karla Eva Urrutia Gómez (born 10 April 1994 in Uruapan, Michoacán) is a professional female squash player from Mexico who has won multiple medals representing her country at the Central American and Caribbean Games and at the Pan American Games.

References

External links

1994 births
Living people
Mexican female squash players
Sportspeople from Michoacán
People from Uruapan
Pan American Games bronze medalists for Mexico
Squash players at the 2015 Pan American Games
Pan American Games medalists in squash
Central American and Caribbean Games gold medalists for Mexico
Competitors at the 2014 Central American and Caribbean Games
Central American and Caribbean Games medalists in squash
Medalists at the 2015 Pan American Games
21st-century Mexican women